Gerli is a town in Buenos Aires Province, Argentina. It lies in the partidos of Avellaneda and Lanús and forms part of the Greater Buenos Aires urban agglomeration.

History
30 March 1909: The settlement was officially established on territory owned by Antonio Gerli.
1944: Gerli was divided by the creation of the Lanús Partido.
11 November 2005: Gerli was officially declared a municipality by the Legislature of Buenos Aires Province.

Population
Gerli had a population of 64,640 inhabitants , 31,090 in Avellaneda and 33,250 in Lanús.

Sport
The town is home to Club El Porvenir a football club who play in the lower leagues of Argentine football.

Neighbourhoods

 Barrio 15 de Noviembre (1969)
 Barrio Agüero (1958)
 Barrio La Maquinita (1965)
 Barrio Obrero Nº 2 (1950)
 Barrio Unidad y Lucha (1985)
 Gerli Este
 Gerli Oeste (1916)
 La Mosca (1930)
 Villa Angélica (1910)
 Villa Argentina (1913)
 Villa Armandina (1922)
 Villa Aurora (1908)
 Villa Calcagnino (1913)
 Villa Campomar (1929)
 Villa Dorado (1916)
 Villa Echenagucía (1894)
 Villa Fischer (1900)
 Villa Garbarino (1906)
 Villa Heredia (1915)
 Villa Hunter (1926)
 Villa Ideal (1912)
 Villa Iris (1913)
 Villa Isabel (1912)
 Villa Kilómetro 5 (1925)
 Villa Mailhos (1927)
 Villa Marconi (1938)
 Villa Mercado (1924)
 Villa Modelo (1914)
 Villa Moss (1910)
 Villa Otamendi (1930)
 Villa Oyuela (1925)
 Villa San Martín (1924)
 Villa Sapito (1960)
 Villa Sarmiento (1945)

External links

Municipal website 

Populated places in Buenos Aires Province
Populated places established in 1909
Avellaneda Partido
Lanús Partido
1909 establishments in Argentina
Cities in Argentina